David Cebrián Ariza (born 27 April 1991) is a Spanish racing driver currently competing in the Renault Sport Trophy. He previously competed in the TCR International Series and SEAT León Eurocup.

Racing career
Cebrián began his career in 2009 in the Peugeot 207 Cup Spain, he won the championship in 2010. He switched to the SEAT León Eurocup in 2010. From 2011-2013 he raced in the SEAT Leon Supercopa France and Renault Clio Cup Spain championships. In April 2015, it was announced that Cebrián would make his TCR International Series debut with JSB Compétition driving a SEAT León Cup Racer.

Racing record

Complete TCR International Series results
(key) (Races in bold indicate pole position) (Races in italics indicate fastest lap)

†  Driver did not finish the race, but was classified as he completed over 90% of the race distance.

Notes

References

External links
 

1991 births
Living people
Spanish racing drivers
SEAT León Eurocup drivers
TCR International Series drivers